Tiffanie is a feminine given name. Notable people with the name include:

 Tiffanie Anderson (born 1988), African American singer and dancer
 Tiffanie DeBartolo (born 1970), American novelist and filmmaker

See also
 Tiffany (given name)

Feminine given names